The  Adams—Matheson House, located at 116 Athens St. in Hartwell, Georgia, was built in 1900.  It was listed on the National Register of Historic Places in 1986.

It is a one-story Victorian Eclectic frame house built in 1900 which had later alterations including a Craftsman-influenced porch.  It has a large gable on its front facade which is covered with fish-scale shingles and has a cut and turned bargeboard.

References

Houses on the National Register of Historic Places in Georgia (U.S. state)
Victorian architecture in Georgia (U.S. state)
Houses completed in 1900
Houses in Hart County, Georgia
National Register of Historic Places in Hart County, Georgia
Hartwell, Georgia